The Labour Representation League (LRL), organised in November 1869, was a forerunner of the British Labour Party.  Its original purpose was to register the working class to vote, and get workers into Parliament.  It had limited power, described by Eugenio Biagini as being "very weak and quite ineffective", and was never intended to become a full political party. However, it played a role in supporting the election of Lib-Lab MPs.  The first secretary was Cooperative Society activist and trade unionist, Lloyd Jones.

In 1874, the League won two parliamentary seats.

In 1886, the TUC created the Labour Electoral Association to replace the League; in turn, this led to the creation of the Labour Party.

Secretaries
 1869: Lloyd Jones
 1873: Henry Broadhurst
 1880: John Hales

References

External links
"Formation of the Labour Party" by Jim Mortimer.

History of the Labour Party (UK)
Political parties established in 1869
1869 establishments in the United Kingdom
Political organisations based in the United Kingdom